Geus or GEUS may refer to:

People 
 Armin Geus (born 1937), German historian
 Jacques Geus (1920–1991), Belgian racing cyclist
 Rob Geus (born 1971), Dutch cook and TV presenter

Other uses 
 Geological Survey of Denmark and Greenland
 Geus River, Guam

See also 
 GEU (disambiguation)
 De Geus, a Dutch surname